Gilliam may refer to:

Places
 Gilliam County, Oregon, on the Columbia River Plateau
 Gilliam, Louisiana, a village
 Gilliam, Missouri, a city
 Gilliam, West Virginia, an unincorporated community

Other uses
 Gilliam (surname)
 USS Gilliam (APA-57), a US Navy attack transport ship
 Gilliam II, a fictional computer system in the manga and anime series Outlaw Star
 Gilliam Candy Company